Dr. Ali Asghar Varsei is an Iranian academic and the 8th chancellor of Imam Khomeini International University from 1997 to 2001.

He graduated from University of Manchester and received his Ph.D. in Mathematics in 1978.

References

Academic staff of Imam Khomeini International University
Alumni of the University of Manchester
Academic staff of the University of Gilan